Joanna Olszewska (born 26 April 1999) is a Polish footballer who plays as a centre back for Ekstraliga club GKS Katowice and the Poland women's national team.

References

External links

1999 births
Living people
Women's association football central defenders
Polish women's footballers
Poland women's international footballers
GKS Katowice players